Spessartine is a nesosilicate, manganese aluminium garnet species, Mn2+3Al2(SiO4)3. This mineral is sometimes mistakenly referred to as spessartite.

Spessartine's name is a derivative of Spessart in Bavaria, Germany, the type locality of the mineral. It occurs most often in granite pegmatite and allied rock types and in certain low-grade metamorphic phyllites. Sources include Australia, Myanmar, India, Afghanistan,  Israel, Madagascar, Namibia, Nigeria, Mozambique, Tanzania and the United States. Spessartine of an orange-yellow has been called Mandarin garnet and is found in Madagascar. Violet-red spessartines are found in rhyolites in Colorado and Maine. In Madagascar, spessartines are exploited either in their bedrock or in alluvium. The orange garnets result from sodium-rich pegmatites. Spessartines are found in bedrock in the highlands in the Sahatany valley. Those in alluvium are generally found in southern Madagascar or in the Maevatanana region.

Spessartine forms a solid solution series with the garnet species almandine. Well-formed crystals from this series, varying in color from very dark-red to bright yellow-orange, were found in Latinka, Rhodope Mountains, Kardzhali Province, Bulgaria.  Spessartine, like the other garnets, always occurs as a blend with other species.  Gems with high spessartine content tend toward a light orange hue, while almandine prevalence induces red or brownish hues.

Images

See also

 Andradite
 Gemstone
 Grossular
 Mineral collecting
 Pyrope
 Tsavorite
 Uvarovite

References

External links

Manganese(II) minerals
Aluminium minerals
Garnet group
Cubic minerals
Minerals in space group 230